Jan of Tarnów ( equally Jan Tarnowski as well as Jan Tarnowski z Tarnowa; c. 1349–1409) was a Polish nobleman (szlachcic) from the Lesser Poland region.

Jan was owner of Tarnów, Wielowieś and Jarosław estates. He was Podkomorzy of Sandomierz before 1368, Court Marshal before 1370, Marshal of the Kingdom of Poland before 1373, starost of Radom before 1376, castellan of Sandomierz before 1377, voivode of Sandomierz Voivodeship before 1385, starost of Sandomierz before 1386, General Starost of Ruthenia before 1387, castellan of Kraków and starost of Kraków in 1406.

In 1401, he was a signatory to the Pact of Vilnius and Radom. His sons Jan and Spytek fought in the Battle of Grunwald in 1410.

References 
 Klemensiewicz, Zenon Historia języka polskiego, (1961), Państwowe Wydawn. Naukowe

1349 births
1409 deaths
14th-century Polish nobility
Jan of Tarnow
15th-century Polish nobility